The West African Spanish mackerel (Scomberomorus tritor) is a species of fish in the family Scombridae.

Specimens have been recorded at up to 100 cm in length, and weighing up to 6 kg. Coloration is bluish-green on the back fading to silvery on the sides marked with about 3 rows of vertically elongate orange spots.

It is found in the eastern Atlantic, along the Atlantic coasts of Africa from Canary Islands and Senegal to the Gulf of Guinea and Baía dos Tigres, Angola. It is rarely found in the northern Mediterranean Sea, along the coasts of France and Italy.

It forms school close to the shore. It feeds on small fishes, especially clupeoides like sardines and anchovies. S. tritor has been erroneously been considered as a synonym of S. maculatus by many authors.

References

 
 Scomberomorus tritor (Cuvier, 1832) Institute of Biology of the Southern Seas. Retrieved on 18 June 2009.

Scombridae
Commercial fish
Fish described in 1832
Taxa named by Georges Cuvier
Scomberomorus